Sonnenfeld may refer to:


People 
 Sonnenfeld (surname), including a list of people with the surname

Places 
 Cieszęta, a village in northern Poland
 Colonia Sonnenfeld (now Aldea San Gregorio), Villaguay Department, Entre Ríos, Argentina
 Ha-Rav Zonenfeld Street, Old City (Jerusalem)
 Sonnenfeld colony, near the hamlet of Oungre, Saskatchewan, Canada

Other 
 Familie Sonnenfeld, a German television series

Alternate spellings 
 Zonenfeld
 Zonnenfeld

See also 
 Sommerfeld
 Sonnefeld
 Sonneveld
 Sonnenfeldt

German-language surnames
Jewish surnames